Minuscule 172 (in the Gregory-Aland numbering), α 404 (Soden), is a Greek minuscule manuscript of the New Testament, on parchment. Palaeographically it has been assigned to the 13th or the 14th century. 
Formerly it was labelled by 178a, 242p, and 87r.
It has marginalia.

Description 

The codex contains the text of the Acts of the Apostles, Pauline epistles, Book of Revelations on 234 parchment leaves (size ) with numerous lacunae. The text is written in one column per page, in 24-30 lines per page. The leaves are arranged in quarto.

The Pauline epistles are written in smaller letters than the rest.

 Lacunae
Acts 1:1-4:24; 5:2-16; 6:2-7:2; 7:16-8:10; 8:38-9:13; 9:26-39; 10:9-22; 10:43-13:1; 23:32-24:24; 28:23-James 1:5; 3:6-4:16; 2 Peter 3:10-1 John 1:1; 3:13-4:2; Jude 16-25; Romans 14:23 - 15:1.4; 1 Corinthians 3:15-15:23; 2 Corinthians 10: 14-11:19; 13:5-13; Ephesians 1:1-2:14; 5:29-6:24 Colossians 1:24-26; 2:4-7; 2 Thessalonians 1:1-3:5; Hebrews 9:3-10:29 Rev 14:4-14; 21: 12-22:21.

Text 

Kurt Aland the Greek text of the codex did not place in any Category.

History 

It was examined by Birch (about 1782), Scholz, and Scrivener. Scrivener in 1856 fully collated Apocalypse. C. R. Gregory saw it in 1883. Formerly it was labelled by 178a, 242p, and 87r. In 1908 Gregory gave for it number 172.

It is currently housed at the Berlin State Library (Phill. 1461), at Berlin.

See also 

 List of New Testament minuscules
 Biblical manuscript
 Textual criticism

References

Further reading 

 F. H. A. Scrivener, An Exact Transcript of the Codex Augiensis (Cambridge and London, 1859), pp. 76–77. (as m)

Greek New Testament minuscules
13th-century biblical manuscripts